This list of Nepenthes species is a comprehensive listing of all known species of the carnivorous plant genus Nepenthes arranged according to their distribution. It is based on the 2009 monograph Pitcher Plants of the Old World and, unless otherwise stated, all information is taken from this source.

Several species with an expansive geographical range are mentioned more than once. Species that are not endemic to a given region are marked with an asterisk.

Philippines

Nepenthes species recorded from the Philippines.

 N. abalata
 N. abgracilis
 N. aenigma
 N. alata
 N. alfredoi
 N. alzapan
 N. argentii
 N. armin
 N. attenboroughii
 N. barcelonae
 N. bellii
 N. burkei
 N. cabanae
 ?N. campanulata *
 N. candalaga
 N. ceciliae
 N. cid
 N. copelandii
 N. cornuta
 N. deaniana
 N. erucoides
 N. extincta
 N. gantungensis
 N. graciliflora
 N. hamiguitanensis
 N. justinae
 N. kitanglad
 N. leonardoi
 N. leyte
 N. malimumuensis
 N. manobo
 N. mantalingajanensis
 N. maximoides
 N. merrilliana
 N. micramphora
 N. mindanaoensis
 N. mira
 N. mirabilis *
 N. nebularum
 N. negros
 N. palawanensis
 N. pantaronensis
 N. peltata
 N. petiolata
 N. philippinensis
 N. pulchra
 N. ramos
 N. robcantleyi
 N. samar
 N. saranganiensis
 N. sibuyanensis
 N. sumagaya
 N. surigaoensis
 N. talaandig
 N. tboli
 N. truncata
 N. ultra
 N. ventricosa
 N. viridis
 N. zygon
 N. sp. Anipahan

Borneo

Nepenthes species recorded from Borneo.

 N. albomarginata *
 N. ampullaria *
 N. appendiculata
 N. bicalcarata
 N. boschiana
 N. burbidgeae
 N. campanulata *
 N. chaniana
 N. clipeata
 N. edwardsiana
 N. ephippiata
 N. epiphytica
 N. faizaliana
 N. fractiflexa
 N. fusca
 N. glandulifera
 N. gracilis *
 N. hemsleyana
 N. hirsuta
 N. hispida
 N. hurrelliana
 N. lowii
 N. macrophylla
 N. macrovulgaris
 N. mapuluensis
 N. mirabilis *
 N. mollis
 N. muluensis
 N. murudensis
 N. northiana
 N. pilosa
 N. platychila
 N. pudica
 N. rafflesiana *
 N. rajah
 N. reinwardtiana *
 N. stenophylla
 N. tentaculata *
 N. veitchii
 N. villosa
 N. vogelii

Sumatra

Nepenthes species recorded from Sumatra.

 N. adnata
 N. albomarginata *
 N. ampullaria *
 N. angasanensis
 N. aristolochioides
 N. beccariana
 N. bongso
 N. densiflora
 N. diatas
 N. dubia
 N. eustachya
 N. flava
 N. gracilis *
 N. gymnamphora *
 N. harauensis 
 N. inermis
 N. izumiae
 N. jacquelineae
 N. jamban
 N. junghuhnii
 N. lavicola
 N. lingulata
 N. longifolia
 N. longiptera
 N. mikei
 N. mirabilis *
 N. naga
 N. ovata
 N. putaiguneung
 N. rafflesiana *
 N. reinwardtiana *
 N. rhombicaulis
 N. rigidifolia
 N. singalana
 N. spathulata *
 N. spectabilis
 N. sumatrana
 N. talangensis
 N. tenuis
 N. tobaica

Peninsular Malaysia

Nepenthes species recorded from Peninsular Malaysia.

 N. alba
 N. albomarginata *
 N. ampullaria *
 N. benstonei
 N. berbulu
 N. domei
 N. gracilis *
 N. gracillima
 N. kerrii
 N. latiffiana
 N. macfarlanei
N. malayensis
 N. mirabilis *
 N. rafflesiana *
 N. ramispina
 N. sanguinea *
 N. sericea
 N. ulukaliana

Sulawesi

Nepenthes species recorded from Sulawesi

 N. diabolica
 N. eymae
 N. glabrata
 N. gracilis *
 N. hamata
 N. maryae
 N. maxima *
 N. minima
 N. mirabilis *
 N. nigra
 N. pitopangii
 N. tentaculata *
 N. tomoriana
 N. undulatifolia

Thailand

Nepenthes species recorded from Thailand.

 N. ampullaria *
 N. andamana
 N.  bracteosa
 N. chang
 N. gracilis *
 N.  hirtella
 N. kampotiana *
 N. kerrii
 N. kongkandana
  N. krabiensis
 N. mirabilis *
 N. rosea
 N. sanguinea *
 N. smilesii *
 N. suratensis
 N. thai

New Guinea

Nepenthes species recorded from New Guinea.

 N. ampullaria *
 N. insignis
 N. klossii
 N. lamii
 N. maxima *
 N. mirabilis *
 N. monticola
 N. neoguineensis *
 N. paniculata
 N. papuana
 N. treubiana *

Cambodia

Nepenthes species recorded from Cambodia.

 N. bokorensis
 N. gracilis *
 N. holdenii
 N. kampotiana *
 N. mirabilis *
 N. smilesii *

Maluku Islands

Nepenthes species recorded from the Maluku Islands.

 N. ampullaria *
 N. halmahera
 N. maxima *
 N. mirabilis *
 N. weda

Australia

Nepenthes species recorded from Australia.

 N. mirabilis *
 N. parvula
 N. rowaniae
 N. tenax

Vietnam

Nepenthes species recorded from Vietnam.

 N. kampotiana *
 N. mirabilis *
 N. smilesii *
 N. thorelii

Raja Ampat Islands

Nepenthes species recorded from the Raja Ampat Islands.

 N. danseri
 ?N. neoguineensis *
 ?N. treubiana *
 N. sp. Misool

D'Entrecasteaux Islands

Nepenthes species recorded from the D'Entrecasteaux Islands.

 N. maxima *
 N. mirabilis *
 N. neoguineensis *

Java

Nepenthes species recorded from Java.

 N. gymnamphora *
 N. mirabilis *
 N. spathulata *

Singapore

Nepenthes species recorded from Singapore.

 N. ampullaria *
 N. gracilis *
 N. rafflesiana *

Madagascar

Nepenthes species recorded from Madagascar.

 N. madagascariensis
 N. masoalensis

Laos

Nepenthes species recorded from Laos.

 N. mirabilis *
 N. smilesii *

India

Nepenthes species recorded from India.

 N. khasiana

New Caledonia

Nepenthes species recorded from New Caledonia.

 N. vieillardii

Schouten Islands

Nepenthes species recorded from Schouten Islands.

 N. biak

Seychelles

Nepenthes species recorded from the Seychelles.

 N. pervillei

Sri Lanka

Nepenthes species recorded from Sri Lanka.

 N. distillatoria

Caroline Islands

Nepenthes species recorded from the Caroline Islands

 N. mirabilis *

China

Nepenthes species recorded from China (including Hong Kong and Macau).

 N. mirabilis *

Louisiade Archipelago

Nepenthes species recorded from the Louisiade Archipelago.

 N. mirabilis *

Myanmar

Nepenthes species recorded from Myanmar.

 N. mirabilis *

See also
 List of Nepenthes species
 List of Nepenthes natural hybrids

References

03
Nepenthes03
Nepenthes
Nepenthes Species List03
Nepenthes